The 2015–16 CEV Challenge Cup was the 36th edition of the CEV Challenge Cup tournament, the former CEV Cup.

This edition of the CEV Challenge Cup was historic one since a team from Kosovo was invited for the first time to take part in a CEV competition - the Kosovo's champions Drenica R&Rukolli Skenderaj. Italian club Calzedonia Verona beat Russian Fakel Novy Urengoy in the finale. American outside hitter Taylor Sander received individual award for the Most Valuable Player of the tournament.

Participating teams
The number of participants on the basis of ranking list for European Cup Competitions:

Qualification phase

1st round
1st leg 24 October 2015
2nd leg 25 October 2015

|}

2nd round
1st leg 4–21 November 2016
2nd leg 17–22 November 2016

|}

Main phase
In this phase, the 16 teams eliminated from 2015–16 Men's CEV Cup Round of 32 joined the 16 teams from qualification.

16th finals
1st leg 1–15 December 2016
2nd leg 15–17 December 2016

|}

Notes

8th finals
1st leg 19–21 January 2016
2nd leg 26–28 January 2016

|}

4th finals
1st leg 16–17 February 2016
2nd leg 18 February – 2 March 2016

|}

Final phase

Semi-finals

|}

First leg

|}

Second leg

|}

Final

First leg

|}

Second leg

|}

Final standing

References

External links
 Official site

CEV Challenge Cup
2015 in volleyball
2016 in volleyball